Bohoniki  (Polish Arabic: بوـحـونيكي) is a village in the administrative district of Gmina Sokółka, within Sokółka County, Podlaskie Voivodeship, in north-eastern Poland, close to the border with Belarus. The village has a population of 100.

Bohoniki was primarily a Lipka Tatar settlement. Today, still a few families in the village are Tatars and practicing Muslims. Although residents don't speak their native Tatar language (often written in Latin, Cyrillic or Arabic alphabet), they have close ties to Lipka Tatar and Islamic traditions.

Sites of interest in the village include a 19th-century wooden mosque and a Muslim cemetery.

The village was named one of Poland's official national Historic Monuments (Pomnik historii), as designated November 20, 2012. Its listing is maintained by the National Heritage Board of Poland.

Muslim cemetery

References

Lipka Tatars
Villages in Sokółka County
Islam in Poland